Jorhat Lok Sabha constituency is one of the 14 Lok Sabha constituencies in Assam state in north-eastern India.

Assembly segments
Jorhat Lok Sabha constituency is composed of the following assembly segments:

Members of Parliament

Election results

General election 2019

General elections 2014

General elections 2009

See also
 Jorhat district
 List of Constituencies of the Lok Sabha

References

External links
Jorhat lok sabha constituency election 2019 date and schedule

Lok Sabha constituencies in Assam
Jorhat district